Giorgio Nuti (born 17 February 1954) is an Italian equestrian. He competed at the 1976 Summer Olympics, the 1984 Summer Olympics and the 1992 Summer Olympics.

References

External links
 

1954 births
Living people
Italian male equestrians
Olympic equestrians of Italy
Equestrians at the 1976 Summer Olympics
Equestrians at the 1984 Summer Olympics
Equestrians at the 1992 Summer Olympics
Sportspeople from the Province of Varese
People from Somma Lombardo